George Anton (born ca. 1550), of Lincoln was an English politician and son of Thomas Anton (d.1559) of Strathfieldsaye.

He was a Member (MP) of the Parliament of England for Lincoln in 1589, 1593, 1597 and 1601. He had a private book collection which can be identified by the presence of his armorial stamp.

References

1550s births
17th-century deaths
People from Lincoln, England
English MPs 1589
English MPs 1593
English MPs 1597–1598
English MPs 1601